Josh Brown (born 20 September 1999) is a British figure skater. In the 2015–16 season, he won the British national junior title and was selected to compete at the 2016 World Junior Championships, where he qualified for the free skate. In 2015, he appeared in CBBC's Ice Stars.

Programs

Competitive highlights 
JGP: Junior Grand Prix

References

External links 
 
 

1999 births
British male single skaters
Living people
People from Ascot, Berkshire